Guadalajara, in the Mexican state of Jalisco, has an extensive public art collection. Works include:

 Antimonumenta
 Árbol adentro by José Fors
 Arcos del Milenio by Sebastián
 Equestrian statue of José María Morelos
 La Estampida
 Fuente de los Niños Miones
 Fuente Olímpica
 Inmolación de Quetzalcóatl by Victor Manuel Contreras
 Los magos universales by Alejandro Colunga
 Monumento a la Independencia
 Monumento a la Madre
 Monumento a los Niños Héroes
 Reminiscencia
 La sala de los magos by Alejandro Colunga
 Statue of Agustín de la Rosa
 Statue of Agustín Yáñez
 Statue of Antonio Alcalde Barriga (Rotonda de los Jaliscienses Ilustres)
 Statue of Beatriz Hernández
 Statue of Christopher Columbus
 Statue of Clemente Aguirre
 Statue of Enrique Díaz de León (Rotonda de los Jaliscienses Ilustres)
 Statue of Enrique Díaz de León (University of Guadalajara)
 Statue of Dr. Atl
 Statue of Efraín González Luna
 Statue of Enrique González Martínez
 Statue of Francisco I. Madero
 Statue of Francisco Rojas González
 Statue of Francisco Silva Romero
 Statue of Francisco Tenamaztle
 Statue of Gabriel Flores
 Statue of Heliodoro Hernández Loza
 Statue of Ignacio Vallarta
 Statue of Irene Robledo
 Statue of Jacobo Gálvez
 Statue of Jorge Matute Remus (Centro, Guadalajara)
 Statue of Jorge Matute Remus (Rotonda de los Jaliscienses Ilustres)
 Statue of José Antonio Torres
 Statue of José Clemente Orozco, Centro
 Statue of José Guadalupe Zuno
 Statue of Juan José Arreola
 Statue of Leonardo Oliva
 Statue of Luis Barragán
 Statue of Luis Pérez Verdía
 Statue of Manuel López Cotilla
 Statue of Manuel M. Diéguez
 Statue of Marcelino García Barragán
 Statue of María Izquierdo
 Statue of Mariano Otero
 Statue of Miguel Hidalgo y Costilla
 Statue of Miguel de Ibarra
 Statue of Minerva
 Statue of Pedro Moreno
 Statue of Rafael Preciado Hernández
 Statue of Rita Pérez de Moreno
 Statue of Valentín Gómez Farías
 Statue of Venustiano Carranza
 Las Tres Gracias

Guadalajara, Jalisco
Guadalajara
Guadalajara
public art
public art